Winston Santos (born 5 March 1968) is a Venezuelan wrestler. He competed in the men's Greco-Roman 62 kg at the 1996 Summer Olympics.

References

1968 births
Living people
Venezuelan male sport wrestlers
Olympic wrestlers of Venezuela
Wrestlers at the 1996 Summer Olympics
Place of birth missing (living people)
Pan American Games medalists in wrestling
Pan American Games silver medalists for Venezuela
Pan American Games bronze medalists for Venezuela
Wrestlers at the 1991 Pan American Games
Wrestlers at the 1995 Pan American Games
Medalists at the 1991 Pan American Games
Medalists at the 1995 Pan American Games
20th-century Venezuelan people
21st-century Venezuelan people